Ivester is an unincorporated community in Grundy County, Iowa, United States. It is located on County Road T19 west of Grundy Center, at 42.339581N, -92.994041W.

History
Founded in 1871, Ivester was named after Charles Ivester Keiter, the editor of The Atlas, a Grundy Center newspaper. Ivester had a post office and a German Baptist Church in the late 1800s, founded in 1871, the congregation is still active as Ivester Church of the Brethren. The post office at Ivester closed in 1904.

References

Unincorporated communities in Grundy County, Iowa
Unincorporated communities in Iowa